Simmons Arboretum is a  arboretum in Madison, Mississippi, United States. It is city-owned, a work in progress, and open to the public.

The Arboretum was created from land donated to the city by Dr. and Mrs. Walter Simmons, and has evolved from unimproved land to a nature walk. Nearly a mile (1.6 km) of walking trails now exist, and plants have been identified and cataloged. Ongoing plans include further design, planting, and labeling of the species.

It has been designated a Blue Star Memorial, a tribute to the Armed Forces of America, by Northbay-Madison Garden Club, a National Garden Clubs, Inc. member.

See also 
 List of botanical gardens in the United States

References 

Arboreta in Mississippi
Protected areas of Madison County, Mississippi